"Sedi Mara na kamen studencu" ("Mary is Sitting on a Stone Well") is a folk song. It may have been the source for the melody of the Hawaiian anthem "Aloha ʻOe".

The song comes from the region of Sombor. It was originally sung with an Ekavian accent. The song was written by Dimitrije "Mita" Popovic, a Serbian lawyer and poet born in Hungary. He was in 1841 in Baja (Austrian Empire) and died in Budapest in 1888 (Austria-Hungary).

"Sedi Mara na kamen studencu" has an Austro-German version called "Die Träne" ("The Tear"). When German bandmaster Henri Berger was invited to Hawaii by King Kamehameha V in 1872, he composed Hawaiian songs which were adapted from German folk tunes.

References

Hawaiian music
Serbian folk songs
Croatian folk songs